Commodus (AD 161–192) was the 17th Roman emperor.

It may also refer to:

 Commodus as Hercules, marble portrait sculpture of Commodus
 Lucius Ceionius Commodus (consul 78), member of the gens Ceionia
 Lucius Ceionius Commodus (consul 106), member of the gens Ceionia
 Lucius Ceionius Commodus (AD 101–138), the birth name of Lucius Aelius
 Lucius Ceionius Commodus or Lucius Aelius Aurelius Commodus (AD 130–169), early names of Lucius Verus ( 161–169)